Western Egyptian Bedawi Arabic, also known as Sahil Maryut Bedouin Arabic, is a group of Bedouin Arabic dialects spoken in Western Egypt along the Mediterranean coast, west to the Egypt–Libya border. Ethnologue and Glottolog classify Western Egyptian Bedawi Arabic as a Libyan Arabic dialect.

This variety is spoken by the Awlad Ali tribe, who settled in the edges of Lake Maryut and west of Bihera beginning in the 17th century from the region of Jebel Akhdar (Libya). It is also spoken in Wadi El Natrun. Their dialect is phonologically, morphophonemically and morphologically closer to the Peninsular Bedouin dialects than to the adjacent Egyptian dialects. Egyptian Arabic speakers from other parts of Egypt do not understand the Awlad Ali dialect.

Western Bedouin dialects influenced the dialects of southern Upper Egypt between Asyut and Idfu, and those of the Bahariyya Oasis and Bihera.

Classification 
The dialects spoken in Matruh province as well as in eastern Libya have been traditionally classified as belonging to the Sulaymi Bedouin dialects, characterized by a /g/ reflex of Qāf, the gahawa-syndrome, and feminine plural conjugations and pronouns. However, the classification of North African Bedouin dialects into Hilalian, Sulaimitian, and Ma’qilian groups is not uncontroversial, and is based primarily on socio-historical and geographical considerations. While the dialects of Tripolitania represent a continuation of Tunisian dialects, the dialects of Cyrenaica show affinities with Eastern Bedouin dialects, especially with regards to the gahawa-syndrome and syllable structure.

Phonology 

Notes:

 /ṭ/ is glottalized as in Upper Egyptian Arabic: [tˤʔ]

Grammar

Pronouns 
Contrary to MSA, Western Egyptian Bedawi uses the plural pronouns for dual pronouns:

The following direct object pronominal suffixes are attached to verbs:

The following demonstrative pronouns are used. The form hāḏ̣ayīəhi is also used with the suffix -yīəhi:

The following interrogative pronouns are used:

Verbs

Perfect 
There are two types of strong perfect stems, CiCáC (a-type) and CCiC (i-type). Examples of a-type perfects are misák, nizál, ṭiláʿ, fihám. Examples of i-type perfects are šrib, rkib, zʿil, smiʿ, ʿrif, gdir, kbir, kṯir, tʿib, lbis, ybis.

Some perfect conjugations are shown below:

Imperfect 
There are three types of strong imperfect stems, CCiC (i-type), CCəC (ə-type), and CCaC (a-type). The vowel of the conjugation prefix harmonizes with the vowel of the stem: yiktib, yərgəd, yašṛab. The conjugation of the 1st person follows the niktib-níkitbu paradigm.

Influence

Bihera 
The pronunciation [ʒ] for ǧīm occurs in the west of the Bihera, were Awlad Ali settled. Metathesized forms such as mašzid “mosque” may be a result of the influence of their dialect.

References

Bibliography

Further reading
 
 
 

Bedouin Arabic
Libyan Arabic